Rohan Du Plooy (born 14 September 1994) is a South African cyclist, who currently rides for UCI Continental team .

In 2019, Du Plooy  won the points classification at the Tour du Rwanda, the Tour of Indonesia, and the Tour of Peninsular. As well as this, he won stage 2 at the Tour of Peninsular, and stage 5 at the Mpumalanga Cycle Tour.

Major results

2011
 3rd Time trial, National Junior Road Championships
2012
 1st  Time trial, National Junior Road Championships
2014
 3rd Time trial, National Under-23 Road Championships
2018
 1st Perwez Grand Prix
 3rd Time trial, National Road Championships
 10th Circuit de Wallonie
2019
 1st Kremetart Cycle Race
 Tour of Peninsular
1st  Points classification
1st Stage 2
 1st  Points classification Tour of Rwanda
 1st  Points classification Tour of Indonesia
 1st Stage 5 Mpumalanga Cycle Tour
 9th Overall Tour of China I

References

External links

1994 births
Living people
South African male cyclists
Sportspeople from Cape Town